Zoltán Társi (born 20 May 1961) is a retired Hungarian high jumper.

He was born in Oroszlány. He became Hungarian high jump champion in 1980, and competed at the 1980 European Indoor Championships and the 1980 Summer Olympics, but without reaching the final round.

His personal best jump was 2.24 metres, achieved in 1980.

See also
József Jámbor – who was the Hungarian high jump champion in 1979.

References

1961 births
Living people
Hungarian male high jumpers
Athletes (track and field) at the 1980 Summer Olympics
Olympic athletes of Hungary